Charles Sargeant Jagger  (17 December 1885 – 16 November 1934) was a British sculptor who, following active service in the First World War, sculpted many works on the theme of war. He is best known for his war memorials, especially the Royal Artillery Memorial at Hyde Park Corner and the Great Western Railway War Memorial in Paddington Railway Station. He also designed several other monuments around Britain and other parts of the world.

Biography
Jagger was the son of a colliery manager, and was educated at Sheffield Royal Grammar School. At age 14 he became an apprentice metal engraver with the Sheffield firm Mappin & Webb.

He studied at the Sheffield School of Art before moving to London to study sculpture at the Royal College of Art (1908–11) under Édouard Lantéri. Jagger worked as Lanteri's assistant, and also as instructor in modelling at the Lambeth School of Art. He counted among his friends William Reid Dick and William McMillan. His early works dealt with classical and literary themes and were influenced by the New Sculpture movement in the focus on medievalism and on surface qualities. His student work won him a travelling scholarship that made it possible for him to spend several months in Rome and Venice. In 1914 he won the British Prix de Rome.

Both his elder sister, Edith, and his younger brother, David, were painters.

Military service
When war broke out in 1914, Jagger gave up his Rome scholarship to join the army. At first, Jagger joined the Artists' Rifles, and in 1915 he was commissioned in the Worcestershire Regiment. Jagger served in Gallipoli and on the Western Front, and was wounded three times. He was awarded the Military Cross for gallantry.

Work as a sculptor
Jagger's style tended towards realism, especially his portrayal of soldiers. The fashion at the time was for idealism and modernism in sculpture, but Jagger's figures were rugged and workman-like, earning him a reputation for 'realist' sculpture. Although Jagger was commissioned as a sculptor of a variety of monuments, it is for his war memorials that he is chiefly remembered.

Whilst convalescing from war wounds in 1919, he began work on No Man's Land, a low relief which is today is part of the Tate Collection. It depicts a "listening post", a technique of trench warfare in which a soldier would hide among the corpses, broken stretchers and barbed wire of No Man's Land, in order to listen for the enemy.

His Royal Artillery Memorial (1921–25) at Hyde Park Corner in London is one of his best-known works. It features a giant sculpture of a howitzer surrounded by four bronze soldiers and stone relief scenes, and is dedicated to casualties in the British Royal Regiment of Artillery in World War I. When Jagger was commissioned to work on the Royal Artillery Memorial, he remarked to the Daily Express the "experience in the trenches persuaded me of the necessity for frankness and truth".

Monumental works of the period used symbolic figures rather than actual depictions of soldiers. Furthermore, during the war years, a government edict had banned images of dead British soldiers. Jagger defied both these conventions by creating realistic bronze figures of three standing soldiers and the body of a dead soldier laid out and shrouded by a greatcoat. The Gunner became the inspiration for a hero in the children's fantasy novel Stoneheart by Charlie Fletcher.

Jagger was made an Associate of the Royal Academy in 1926.

After the demand for war memorials had subsided, Jagger continued to receive important commissions and his works were increasingly influenced by Art Deco. Some of his works include allegorical stone figures at Imperial Chemical House, London (1928) and The Kelham Rood (1929).

In 1931 Jagger was commissioned by architect Edwin Lutyens to design a sculpture of Christ the King for the designs for Liverpool Metropolitan Cathedral. The sculpture was never executed because Lutyens' design was extremely costly and funding for the building work ran out. A model of Lutyens' unrealised building is displayed in the Walker Art Gallery. Jagger was also commissioned to provide sculptures of elephants and imperial lions for Lutyens' government buildings in New Delhi, India.

Jagger produced many smaller works, such as busts, statuettes, reliefs, and exhibited them at the Royal Academy in 1913–34, his work continued to be exhibited posthumously, including at the Glasgow Empire Exhibition in 1938.

Charles Sargeant Jagger died suddenly from pneumonia on 16 November 1934. He was in the process of finishing a statue of George V for New Delhi at his death, and work on it was completed by William Reid Dick. A documentary about Jagger's work and featuring this statue of George V was in the process of being filmed by Pathe. This was edited into a short two-minute filmic obituary which was released under the title An Unfinished Symphony in Stone.

A touring memorial exhibition was organised by two of his chief patrons in 1935–36 (Freda, Lady Forres and Henry Mond, 2nd Baron Melchett). Two years later a second touring exhibition was arranged called Art of the Jagger Family, which featured sculptures by Charles Sargeant Jagger together with portraits by his brother, David (also highly successful), and landscapes and flower subjects by his sister, Edith. Thereafter his reputation declined until 1985–86 when a large retrospective exhibition entitled War and Peace Sculpture was held at the Imperial War Museum, with the Mappin Art Gallery, Sheffield.

A blue plaque was unveiled in his home village, Kilnhurst by the Rotherham District Civic Society in October 2018. A similar plaque was unveiled in 2000 at his London home, 67 Albert Bridge Road, Battersea.

Selected works
Jagger's major commissions include the following:

References

Borough of Bedford, Bedfordshire

Further reading
  (exhibition catalogue)

External links

 An Unfinished Symphony in Stone (Pathé, 00:02:26) - a short film about Jagger's work on the sculpture of King George V
 Great Western Railway War Memorial - York University Institute of Railway Studies and Transport History
  - extensive summary of works on the National Archives wiki
 Brits Oorlogsmonument/Monument britannique - the Jagger's Brussels Monument (Dutch language)
 No Man's Land in the Tate Collection (with biography)
 
 Profile on Royal Academy of Arts Collections

1885 births
1934 deaths
Military personnel from Yorkshire
20th-century British sculptors
Alumni of the Royal College of Art
Alumni of Sheffield Hallam University
Artists' Rifles soldiers
Associates of the Royal Academy
British architectural sculptors
British Army personnel of World War I
British war artists
Commonwealth War Graves Commission
English male sculptors
Modern sculptors
People educated at Sheffield Grammar School
People from Kilnhurst
Prix de Rome (Britain) winners
Recipients of the Military Cross
Worcestershire Regiment officers
World War I artists